Alicia Diane Williams (born September 26, 1970) is an American author and teacher. Her debut novel, Genesis Begins Again, published in 2019, received wide praise by several publications, won a Newbery Honor, Coretta Scott King- John Steptoe Award for New Talent, and finalists to the William C. Morris Award and Kirkus Prize for Young Readers Literature.

Early life 

Alicia D. Williams grew up in Detroit, Michigan. After graduating high school, Alicia went on to attend the University of Kentucky and majored in African American Studies. She received her BA in 1994, and went on to New York City, where she trained in theatre at the American Musical and Dramatic Academy. While living in New York, Alicia performed in plays, commercials, sketch comedy, and stand-up comedy. Wanting a change, she moved back to Detroit, where she eventually found a job as a flight attendant and was stationed in Charlotte, North Carolina.

In 1999, Williams had a daughter, Nailah, and afterwards she returned to working with the theater and writing "one-woman historical shows".

Career as a writer 
In 2009, having promised herself she would write a book, she began attending writing conferences. In 2012, Alicia began graduate school at Hamline University. After graduating, she kept working on the manuscript for several years while being employed as a Teaching Artist in Charlotte, North Carolina. In 2015, Alicia completed her manuscript Genesis Begins Again and the book was published in January 2019 by Simon & Schuster/Atheneum Books for Young Readers.

Williams' book was generally praised by critics. She was awarded a Newbery Honor and the Coretta Scott King "John Steptoe Award for New Talent" in 2020. The novel was also a finalist for the William C. Morris Award and the Kirkus Prize for Young Readers Literature.

Works

References

External links 
 

Living people
1970 births
Hamline University alumni
American women children's writers
American children's writers
Flight attendants
Newbery Honor winners
American women novelists
21st-century American novelists
Schoolteachers from North Carolina
American women educators
21st-century American women writers
Writers from Detroit
African-American novelists
Novelists from Michigan
21st-century African-American women writers
21st-century African-American writers
20th-century African-American people
20th-century African-American women